Harry Murphy is a rugby league footballer.

Harry Murphy may also refer to:

Harry Murphy (Gaelic football manager) (born 1959)
Harry Murphy (sport shooter), participated in Shooting at the 2011 Island Games

See also
Henry Murphy (disambiguation)
Harold Murphy (disambiguation)